Alexander Zverev was the defending champion from when the event was held in 2019, but chose not to defend his title.

Casper Ruud won the title, defeating Denis Shapovalov in the final, 7–6(8–6), 6–4.

Seeds
The top four seeds received a bye into the second round.

Draw

Finals

Top half

Bottom half

Qualifying

Seeds

Qualifiers

Lucky loser
  Daniel Altmaier

Qualifying draw

First qualifier

Second qualifier

Third qualifier

Fourth qualifier

References

External links
 Main draw
 Qualifying draw

Singles